Halfway Nunatak is an isolated nunatak in the Antarctica, on the west side of The Landing, and almost in the center of the upper Skelton Glacier. It was surveyed and descriptively named in 1957 by the New Zealand party of the Commonwealth Trans-Antarctic Expedition, 1956–58.

See also
Baumann Crag
Schulz Crag

References

Nunataks of the Ross Dependency
Hillary Coast